Nyctelius nyctelius, known generally as the violet-banded skipper or nyctelius skipper, is a species of grass skipper in the butterfly family Hesperiidae. It is found in Central America, North America, and South America.

The MONA or Hodges number for Nyctelius nyctelius is 4123.

Subspecies
These two subspecies belong to the species Nyctelius nyctelius:
 Nyctelius nyctelius agari Dillon, 1948
 Nyctelius nyctelius nyctelius (Latreille, 1824)

References

Further reading

External links

 

Hesperiinae
Articles created by Qbugbot
Butterflies described in 1824